Acanthodoxus delta is a species of longhorn beetles of the subfamily Lamiinae from Brazil. It was described by Martins and Monné in 1974.

References

Beetles described in 1974
Endemic fauna of Brazil
Acanthocinini